Gateway To Honor was a professional wrestling event promoted by Ring of Honor (ROH). It took place on February 29, 2020 from the Family Arena in St. Charles, Missouri.

Results

See also
2020 in professional wrestling

References

External links
Official site for PPV

Professional wrestling in Missouri
2020 in Missouri
Events in Missouri
Events in St. Charles, Missouri